Hegeler is a German surname. Notable people with the surname include:

Anja Hegeler (1965–2022), German chess master
Edward C. Hegeler (1835–1910), American metallurgist and businessman
Hartmut Hegeler (born 1946), German theologian
Jens Hegeler (born 1988), German footballer
Wilhelm Hegeler (1870–1943), German writer

German-language surnames